Kenneth Colster Blackburn  (born 1935) is a New Zealand actor and writer.  He has worked in film, television, radio and theatre in New Zealand, Australia, and the United Kingdom since 1972.

Biography
Blackburn was born in Bristol, England, and completed his education in New Zealand.  In an acting career dominated by New Zealand productions, he is best known internationally for his roles in Xena: Warrior Princess and Farscape.  In New Zealand he is remembered as the boss in popular Roger Hall sitcom Gliding On. Blackburn's other screen roles include breakthrough kidult series Hunter's Gold, and 'baddy' roles on New Zealand's longest-running soap operas: Close to Home and Shortland Street.  He also had a starring role in 1978 feature Skin Deep, playing a local identity who encourages the gym in his town to employ a city masseuse in a bid to improve the town's image.

Blackburn has an extensive career as a theatrical performer; in 1999 his performance as Vladimir in Waiting for Godot earned him the Best Actor award at the Chapman Tripp Theatre Awards. In the 2005 Queen's Birthday Honours, he was appointed a Member of the New Zealand Order of Merit, for services to the performing arts.

Publication
In 1991, the BBC published Blackburn's book Blitz Kids, about the Bristol Blitz.

References

 Bristol Reads: Bristol at War, accessed 12 June 2009.
 NZ On Screen profile, accessed April 2012.
 TV.com profile, accessed 12 June 2009.
 Ken Blackburn CV on Auckland Actors, accessed 12 June 2009.
 Roger Hall’s Who Wants to be 100?, Scoop, 11 February 2008.

External links
 

1935 births
Living people
Members of the New Zealand Order of Merit
Male actors from Bristol
New Zealand male film actors
New Zealand male stage actors
New Zealand male television actors
New Zealand male soap opera actors
English emigrants to New Zealand